Patrice Sousia (born 18 January 1999) is a Cameroonian footballer who plays as a forward for Mollerussa.

Club career
Born in Douala, Cameroon, Sousia began his career at the Samuel Eto'o Academy, before moving to Spain to join Barcelona in 2012. However, due to his age at the time of signing, this deal came under scrutiny from international body FIFA, who sanctioned Barcelona for the transfer, handing Sousia a ban until he turned eighteen. He was later told by FIFA that he was unable to train at Barcelona's facilities, nor live on the La Masia campus.

After being kicked out of the club, and made homeless by the FIFA verdict, teammate Álex Collado's family offered Sousia refuge, welcoming him into their home. While staying with the Collados, Sousia trained with Prat, the club Álex's brother, Jonathan, played for. At Prat, he was helped by teammate Federico Bessone and manager Pedro Dólera to settle and come to terms with the situation. 

He stayed with the Collados for a few weeks, before moving into the Joaquim Blume d'Esplugues - a residence for athletes. On his eighteenth birthday, Sousia returned to Barcelona, who had been covering his expenses while he was banned. However, his return was not seen as successful by his coaches, who told him after three months that he would be sold in the summer. Following interest from Cornellà and Damm, he joined the latter on loan in late 2017.

After leaving Barcelona, he played for Tercera División sides Minerva and Tenisca. In July 2020, Sousia signed for Calahorra, being assigned to the club's B team.

International career
In 2018, Sousia was called up to the Cameroon national under-20 football team.

Career statistics

Club

Notes

References

1999 births
Living people
Footballers from Douala
Cameroonian footballers
Cameroon youth international footballers
Association football forwards
Tercera División players
Primera Catalana players
FC Barcelona players
CF Damm players
CD Calahorra players
Cameroonian expatriate footballers
Cameroonian expatriate sportspeople in Spain
Expatriate footballers in Spain